Kyong Won-ha (born 1928) is a nuclear scientist who may have participated in developing the North Korean nuclear program.

According to a 2003 report, he left North Korea in 2002 with help from Spanish officials, ultimately defecting to the United States.

See also
North Korea and weapons of mass destruction
North Korean defectors
Nuclear technology

References

External links
 Nuclear scientists 'defect' as North Korea defies America
 North Korean Nuclear Developments: An Updated Chronology 1947-1989

North Korean defectors
North Korean scientists
North Korean nuclear physicists
Living people
1928 births
20th-century North Korean scientists
21st-century North Korean scientists